Kallukse is a village in Kadrina Parish, Lääne-Viru County, in northeastern Estonia. It lies on the left bank of the Loobu River.

References

Villages in Lääne-Viru County